The 2018–19 Danish Cup, also known as Sydbank Pokalen, was the 65th season of the Danish Cup competition. The winners of the tournament, Midtjylland, earned qualification into the third qualifying round of the 2019–20 UEFA Europa League.

Structure
88 teams, representing all levels of competition, participated in the 44 first-round matches.  Eight more teams from the two highest divisions entered round two while the remaining six teams from the 2018-19 Danish Superliga joined the competition in the third round.

Participants
102 teams competed for the Danish Cup. All teams from the top three divisions in 2017–18 are automatically entered while lower division teams play qualifying matches to enter the competition.

2018–19 Alka Superliga

2018–19 NordicBet Liga

2018–19 Danish 2nd Division

DBU Bornholm

DBU Funen

DBU Jutland

DBU Copenhagen

DBU Lolland-Falster

DBU Zealand

First round
In the first round of the tournament the teams are divided into a West and East pool. In the West Pool, 46 teams participate, divided into two pools, the "Funen / Jutland Pool" and "Jutland Pool". The East Pool consists of 42 teams and is not split up.

The draw was held on Friday, 22 June 2018.

West, Jutland

West, Funen/Jutland

East

Second round

Third round

Fourth round

Bracket

Quarter-finals

Semi-finals

Final

References

Danish Cup seasons
Danish
Cup